Alfred Weidenmann (10 May 1916 – 9 June 2000) was a German film director, screenwriter, and author of children's books. He directed more than 30 films between 1942 and 1984.

Selected filmography

 Hände hoch (1942)
  (1944)
 I and You (1953)
 Canaris (1954)
  (1955)
 Alibi (1955)
 Heaven Is Never Booked Up (1955)
 Kitty and the Great Big World (1956)
 Der Stern von Afrika (1957)
 Scampolo (1958)
  (1958)
 The Buddenbrooks (1959)
  (Bumerang) (1960)
 Sacred Waters (1960)
 Adorable Julia (1962)
 Only a Woman (1962)
  (1963)
 Condemned to Sin (1964)
 Shots in Threequarter Time (1965)
 The Gentlemen (1965)
 Who Wants to Sleep? (1965)
 I Am Looking for a Man (1966)
 Maigret and His Greatest Case (1966)
 Pistolen-Jenny (1969, TV film)
 Under the Roofs of St. Pauli (1970)
 The Bordello (1971)
 Sonderdezernat K1 (1972–1981, TV series, 7 episodes)
  (1973)
 Derrick (1975–1998, TV series, 30 episodes)
 The Old Fox (1977–1999, TV series, 14 episodes)
 The Rider on the White Horse (1978)
 Der keusche Lebemann (1978, TV film)
 Mensch ohne Fahrschein (1984, TV film)

References

External links

1916 births
2000 deaths
Mass media people from Stuttgart
Best Director German Film Award winners